Divorciadas  (English title: Divorced) is a Mexican telenovela produced by Televisa and transmitted by Telesistema Mexicano.

Ariadna Welter, Ofelia Guilmáin and Susana Cabrera starred as protagonists.

Cast 
Ariadna Welter
Ofelia Guilmáin
Susana Cabrera
Manolita Saval
Dina de Marco
Germán Robles
Ramón Bugarini

References 

Mexican telenovelas
1961 telenovelas
Televisa telenovelas
1961 Mexican television series debuts
1961 Mexican television series endings
Spanish-language telenovelas